Muhsin al-Tabatabaei al-Hakim (31 May 1889 – 2 June 1970) was an Iraqi Shia religious authority. 

He became the leading marja' of Najaf in 1946 after the death of Abu al-Hasan al-Isfahani, and of the majority of the Shia world in 1961, after the death of Hossein Borujerdi.

See also
Abu al-Hasan al-Isfahani
Abu al-Qasim al-Khoei
Aqa Najafi Quchani
Najaf Seminary

References

External links
Shia Leadership

Iraqi ayatollahs
1889 births
1970 deaths
Al-Hakim family
Iraqi anti-communists
Burials at Imam Ali Mosque
Iraqi Shia Muslims
20th-century Iraqi people
Pupils of Muhammad Kadhim Khorasani